The First Presbyterian Church is a historic church at the junction of Market and Church Streets, SW corner in Stamps, Arkansas.  The wood-frame structure was built in 1905, during Lafayette County's timber boom brought about by the arrival of the railroad.  It was built for one of the first congregations to form in Stamps, and is one of the few buildings in the city to survive from the period.  It is a fine local example of Gothic Revival architecture.

The building was listed on the National Register of Historic Places in 1996.

See also
National Register of Historic Places listings in Lafayette County, Arkansas

References

Churches on the National Register of Historic Places in Arkansas
Carpenter Gothic church buildings in Arkansas
Churches completed in 1905
Churches in Lafayette County, Arkansas
National Register of Historic Places in Lafayette County, Arkansas
1905 establishments in Arkansas